Takuya Wada (born February 14, 1978) is a Japanese mixed martial artist and professional wrestler. He competed in the Welterweight and Middleweight divisions.

Career

Mixed martial arts
Wada is a disciple of Kazuhiro Kusayanagi and Tenshin Matsumoto at Shooto Gym K'z Factory. He debuted in 1999 for Shooto before moving to Pancrase in 2002. 

Wada became the interim Welterweight King of Pancrase in 2008, defeating Jason Palacios.

Professional wrestling

His professional wrestling career began in 2015 for former Dramatic Dream Team sister promotion Hard Hit, facing Hikaru Sato. He is a mainstay of the Hard Hit promotion. 

Wada embarked on a tour with All Japan Pro Wrestling throughout 2016 to 2017 and 2019, teaming with Atsushi Aoki, Yuya Aoki and Ultimo Dragon. He continues to have sporadic appearances, often appearing in tag matches with Hikaru Sato as of recently August 2021.

In December 2020, he made it to the finals of the Hard Hit King of Hard Hit tournament defeating Hideki "Shrek" Sekine.

Championships and accomplishments
 Pancrase
Welterweight King of Pancrase (1 time, interim champion)

Hard Hit
King of Hard Hit Tournament finalist (2020)

Mixed martial arts record

|-
| Loss
| align=center| 20-9-10 (1)
| Keita Nakamura
| Submission (Punches)
| SRC: Sengoku Raiden Championship 15
| 
| align=center| 1
| align=center| 3:30
| Tokyo, Japan
| 
|-
| Win
| align=center| 20-8-10 (1)
| Jae Sun Lee
| Decision (Split)
| SRC: Sengoku Raiden Championship 13
| 
| align=center| 3
| align=center| 5:00
| Tokyo, Japan
| 
|-
| Win
| align=center| 19-8-10 (1)
| Shiko Yamashita
| Submission (Rear-Naked Choke)
| Shooto: Revolutionary Exchanges 3
| 
| align=center| 3
| align=center| 4:26
| Tokyo, Japan
| 
|-
| Draw
| align=center| 18-8-10 (1)
| Kengo Ura
| Draw (Unanimous)
| Pancrase: Changing Tour 6
| 
| align=center| 2
| align=center| 5:00
| Tokyo, Japan
| 
|-
| Win
| align=center| 18-8-9 (1)
| Tomoyoshi Iwamiya
| Decision (Majority)
| Pancrase: Changing Tour 2
| 
| align=center| 3
| align=center| 5:00
| Tokyo, Japan
| 
|-
| Win
| align=center| 17-8-9 (1)
| Masahiro Toryu
| Decision (Unanimous)
| Pancrase: Shining 10
| 
| align=center| 3
| align=center| 5:00
| Tokyo, Japan
| 
|-
| Draw
| align=center| 16-8-9 (1)
| Masahiro Toryu
| Draw
| Pancrase: Shining 9
| 
| align=center| 2
| align=center| 5:00
| Tokyo, Japan
| 
|-
| Win
| align=center| 16-8-8 (1)
| Jason Palacios
| Decision (Unanimous)
| Pancrase: Shining 3
| 
| align=center| 3
| align=center| 5:00
| Tokyo, Japan
| 
|-
| Win
| align=center| 15-8-8 (1)
| Seiki Ryo
| Decision (Unanimous)
| Pancrase: Rising 9
| 
| align=center| 2
| align=center| 5:00
| Tokyo, Japan
| 
|-
| NC
| align=center| 14-8-8 (1)
| Hyung Kwang Kim
| No Contest
| Pancrase: Rising 8
| 
| align=center| 2
| align=center| 1:40
| Tokyo, Japan
| 
|-
| Win
| align=center| 14-8-8
| Sotaro Yamada
| Decision (Unanimous)
| Pancrase: Rising 4
| 
| align=center| 2
| align=center| 5:00
| Tokyo, Japan
| 
|-
| Loss
| align=center| 13-8-8
| Stephen Haigh
| Submission (Rear-Naked Choke)
| Bodog Fight: Costa Rica Combat
| 
| align=center| 3
| align=center| 1:37
| Costa Rica
| 
|-
| Win
| align=center| 13-7-8
| Tadasuke Yoshida
| Submission (Rear-Naked Choke)
| Pancrase: Blow 10
| 
| align=center| 1
| align=center| 4:22
| Tokyo, Japan
| 
|-
| Loss
| align=center| 12-7-8
| Carlos Condit
| Submission (Kimura)
| Pancrase: Blow 7
| 
| align=center| 3
| align=center| 4:22
| Tokyo, Japan
| 
|-
| Draw
| align=center| 12-6-8
| Shinsuke Shoji
| Draw
| Pancrase: Blow 3
| 
| align=center| 2
| align=center| 5:00
| Tokyo, Japan
| 
|-
| Loss
| align=center| 12-6-7
| Kuniyoshi Hironaka
| Submission (Triangle Choke)
| GCM: D.O.G. 4
| 
| align=center| 1
| align=center| 4:29
| Tokyo, Japan
| 
|-
| Win
| align=center| 12-5-7
| Masakazu Kuramochi
| Decision (Unanimous)
| Pancrase: 2005 Neo-Blood Tournament Finals
| 
| align=center| 2
| align=center| 5:00
| Tokyo, Japan
| 
|-
| Draw
| align=center| 11-5-7
| Yuji Hoshino
| Draw
| GCM: D.O.G. 2
| 
| align=center| 2
| align=center| 5:00
| Tokyo, Japan
| 
|-
| Draw
| align=center| 11-5-6
| Hiroki Nagaoka
| Draw
| Pancrase: Spiral 2
| 
| align=center| 2
| align=center| 5:00
| Yokohama, Kanagawa, Japan
| 
|-
| Loss
| align=center| 11-5-5
| Katsuya Inoue
| Decision (Unanimous)
| Pancrase: Brave 8
| 
| align=center| 3
| align=center| 5:00
| Tokyo, Japan
| 
|-
| Win
| align=center| 11-4-5
| Hidetaka Monma
| Decision (Majority)
| Pancrase: Brave 5
| 
| align=center| 3
| align=center| 5:00
| Tokyo, Japan
| 
|-
| Loss
| align=center| 10-4-5
| Jorge Santiago
| Submission (Armbar)
| AFC 7: Absolute Fighting Championships 7
| 
| align=center| 1
| align=center| 1:52
| Fort Lauderdale, Florida, United States
| 
|-
| Win
| align=center| 10-3-5
| Minoru Ozawa
| Decision (Unanimous)
| Pancrase: Hybrid 9
| 
| align=center| 2
| align=center| 5:00
| Tokyo, Japan
| 
|-
| Draw
| align=center| 9-3-5
| Kenichi Serizawa
| Draw
| Pancrase: Hybrid 6
| 
| align=center| 3
| align=center| 5:00
| Tokyo, Japan
| 
|-
| Draw
| align=center| 9-3-4
| Satoru Kitaoka
| Draw
| Pancrase: Hybrid 4
| 
| align=center| 2
| align=center| 5:00
| Tokyo, Japan
| 
|-
| Draw
| align=center| 9-3-3
| Koji Oishi
| Draw
| Pancrase: Hybrid 1
| 
| align=center| 2
| align=center| 5:00
| Tokyo, Japan
| 
|-
| Loss
| align=center| 9-3-2
| Takafumi Ito
| Decision (Unanimous)
| Pancrase: Spirit 8
| 
| align=center| 3
| align=center| 5:00
| Yokohama, Kanagawa, Japan
| 
|-
| Loss
| align=center| 9-2-2
| Dave Strasser
| Decision (Split)
| Shooto: Treasure Hunt 6
| 
| align=center| 3
| align=center| 5:00
| Tokyo, Japan
| 
|-
| Win
| align=center| 9-1-2
| Seichi Ikemoto
| Decision (Unanimous)
| Shooto: Treasure Hunt 3
| 
| align=center| 3
| align=center| 5:00
| Kobe, Hyogo, Japan
| 
|-
| Loss
| align=center| 8-1-2
| Jutaro Nakao
| Submission (Triangle Choke)
| Shooto: To The Top Final Act
| 
| align=center| 1
| align=center| 4:07
| Urayasu, Chiba, Japan
| 
|-
| Win
| align=center| 8-0-2
| Jason Buck
| Decision (Majority)
| Shooto: To The Top 9
| 
| align=center| 2
| align=center| 5:00
| Tokyo, Japan
| 
|-
| Win
| align=center| 7-0-2
| Isao Tanimura
| Decision (Unanimous)
| Shooto: To The Top 5
| 
| align=center| 2
| align=center| 5:00
| Setagaya, Tokyo, Japan
| 
|-
| Win
| align=center| 6-0-2
| Cedric Ribes
| Submission (Heel Hook)
| GT: Golden Trophy 2001
| 
| align=center| 1
| align=center| 1:02
| France
| 
|-
| Win
| align=center| 5-0-2
| Rafles la Rose
| Decision (Unanimous)
| Shooto: R.E.A.D. 12
| 
| align=center| 2
| align=center| 5:00
| Tokyo, Japan
| 
|-
| Draw
| align=center| 4-0-2
| Yuji Kusu
| Draw
| Shooto: R.E.A.D. 9
| 
| align=center| 2
| align=center| 5:00
| Yokohama, Kanagawa, Japan
| 
|-
| Draw
| align=center| 4-0-1
| Seichi Ikemoto
| Draw
| Shooto: R.E.A.D. 5
| 
| align=center| 2
| align=center| 5:00
| Tokyo, Japan
| 
|-
| Win
| align=center| 4-0
| Boris Viale
| Submission (Choke)
| GT: Golden Trophy 2000
| 
| align=center| 0
| align=center| 0:00
| Orléans, France
| 
|-
| Win
| align=center| 3-0
| Didier Lutz
| Submission (Kimura)
| GT: Golden Trophy 2000
| 
| align=center| 0
| align=center| 0:00
| Orléans, France
| 
|-
| Win
| align=center| 2-0
| Rosaire Letapin
| Submission (Heel Hook)
| GT: Golden Trophy 2000
| 
| align=center| 0
| align=center| 0:00
| Orléans, France
| 
|-
| Win
| align=center| 1-0
| Saburo Kawakatsu
| Decision (Majority)
| Shooto: Renaxis 2
| 
| align=center| 2
| align=center| 5:00
| Tokyo, Japan
|

See also
List of male mixed martial artists

References

1975 births
Japanese male mixed martial artists
Japanese male professional wrestlers
Japanese sambo practitioners
Japanese practitioners of Brazilian jiu-jitsu
Welterweight mixed martial artists
Middleweight mixed martial artists
Mixed martial artists utilizing sambo
Mixed martial artists utilizing shoot wrestling
Mixed martial artists utilizing Brazilian jiu-jitsu
Living people